Plant & Food Research (Māori: Rangahau Ahumāra Kai) is a New Zealand Crown Research Institute (CRI). Its purpose is to enhance the value and productivity of New Zealand's horticultural, arable, seafood and food & beverage industries. The interests of the institute are based in horticulture, arable and seafood research, specifically in the areas of sustainable production, bioprotection, elite genetics & intelligent breeding, food and health science and biomaterials.

The institute was formed on 1 December 2008 by merging existing CRIs HortResearch and Crop and Food Research. Plant & Food has over 900 staff based at sites throughout New Zealand as well as science and business development staff working in the United States, Europe, Asia and Australia.

Notable staff 
Trish Fraser, soil scientist

References

External links
 

Crown Research Institutes of New Zealand
Food science institutes
Horticultural organizations